Sindora inermis is a species of plant in the family Fabaceae. It is a tree found in Sumatra and the Philippines. It is threatened by habitat loss.

References

inermis
Vulnerable plants
Trees of Sumatra
Trees of the Philippines
Taxonomy articles created by Polbot
Taxa named by Elmer Drew Merrill